Ace of Cactus Range is a 1924 American silent film directed by Denver Dixon and Malon Andrus and starring Art Mix, Virginia Warwick, and Clifford Davidson. It was released in April 1924.

Plot
U.S. Marshal Bob Cullen has infiltrated a gang of diamond thieves. When a local rancher discovers their operation, the gang's leader, Bull Davidson, begins to harass the rancher's daughter, Virginia Marsden. Attempting to escape the unwanted attention from Davidson, Marsden runs off to a remote cabin, but the gang follows. Cullen creates a diversion by overturning a lantern, then flees the cabin on horseback with Marsden. The gang pursues, and when Cullen's horse is injured in a fall, Cullen and Marsden are forced to spend the night on the open plain. The following morning the gang catches up. They capture Cullen and Marsden, tying Cullen up and leaving him suspended from a tree. Eventually Cullen escapes and makes it back to the gang's camp, where he able to rescue the girl.

Cast list
Art Mix as U. S. Marshal Bob Cullen
Virginia Warwick as Virginia Marsden
Clifford Davidson as Bull Davidson
Harvey Stafford as Randolph Truthers
Dorothy Chase as Cleora
Charles Colby as Sheriff Buck Summers
H. Paul Walsh as Markes
A. W. Dearie as Sam
Charles Mears as Quosmo

Production
In early April 1924 it was announced that Los Angeles distributor R.D. Lewis had acquired the distribution rights to the film, after he moved there from Oklahoma City.  It was part of a six-picture deal of Art Mix films, which included Rider of Mystery Ranch and South of Santa Fe.

References

American silent feature films
American black-and-white films
Films directed by Victor Adamson
1920s American films